Mount Llicho is a mountain on island of the United States territory of Guam. Llicho's closest populated area is Umatac.

References

Llicho